Princess Amalia of Nassau-Dietz (Anna Charlotte Amalie;  – 18 September 1777) was the wife of Frederick, Hereditary Prince of Baden-Durlach, and mother of Charles Frederick, the first Grand Duke of Baden.

Life
Anna Charlotte Amalia was the only daughter of Johan Willem Friso of Nassau-Dietz (after 1702 Prince of Orange) and his wife, Landgravine Marie Louise of Hesse-Kassel. She grew up in Friesland and spoke West Frisian herself.

After her marriage to Friedrich of Baden-Durlach in 1727 she moved to Durlach. During her pregnancies, Amalia tyrannized her servants, and because of the princess's many tantrums, rumors circulated at the court of Durlach that she was mentally ill. Friedrich died on 26 March 1732, shortly after the birth of their second child. As further evidence of her alleged mental illness, it was charged that she shed no tears at the sight of her husband's corpse.

Her father-in-law, Margrave Karl III Wilhelm, did not want Amalia influencing the new crown prince Karl Friedrich; though mother and son continued to live in Karlsburg Castle in Durlach, Amalia lived the rest of her life in a separate apartment in the castle, shielded from the outside world. The education of her two sons, Karl Friedrich and Wilhelm Ludwig, was taken over by her mother-in-law, Magdalena Wilhelmine of Württemberg.

Marriage and children
In 1727 Amalia married Frederick, Hereditary Prince of Baden-Durlach (1703–1732). They had two sons:
 Charles Frederick (1728–1811)
 William Louis (1732–1788)

Ancestry

1710 births
1777 deaths
Amalia
Amalia
Amalia
People from Leeuwarden
Daughters of monarchs